Miguel Ángel Estrella (4 July 1940 – 7 April 2022) was an Argentine pianist, UNESCO Goodwill Ambassador, and a juror of the Russell Tribunal.

As a pianist, he numbered Celia de Bronstein, Erwin Leuchter, and Nadia Boulanger among his mentors.

He was born in San Miguel de Tucumán, Argentina. He went into exile on 1976 during the National Reorganization Process and was imprisoned and tortured in 1977 by the Civic-military dictatorship of Uruguay. He was released in 1980.

From 2007 to 2016 he was the Argentine ambassador to the UNESCO and in 2010 he performed in the Estudio País Bicentenario programme broadcast by the state-run Canal Siete. On 11 March 2013, he was honoured by the Argentine Senate for his career and his defense of human rights.

He died in Paris, France.

References

External links
 Biography of Miguel Angel Estrella
 
 

1940 births
2022 deaths
Argentine classical pianists
People from San Miguel de Tucumán
Argentine torture victims
Recipients of the Legion of Honour
Commandeurs of the Ordre des Arts et des Lettres
Permanent Delegates of Argentina to UNESCO
UNESCO Goodwill Ambassadors
Nansen Refugee Award laureates